GPX2 may refer to:
GPX2 (gene)
Former name of GP2X games console